The Blue Diamond Preview (Colts and Geldings) is a Melbourne Racing Club Listed Thoroughbred horse race, raced under set weights with penalties conditions for two years old colts and geldings, over a distance of 1000 metres run at Caulfield Racecourse in Melbourne, Australia in late January. Prize money for the race is A$200,000. The race lost it Group classification in 2006.

History
The race is considered a lead-up to the Group 2 Blue Diamond Prelude C&G the following month and both races are used as lead-up races to the Group 1 Blue Diamond Stakes in late February at Caulfield. The race is usually held on the Australia Day public holiday. Along with this event the Blue Diamond Preview Fillies is held.

Thoroughbreds that have captured the Blue Diamond Preview – Blue Diamond Stakes double: 
Midnight Fever (1987), Zeditave (1988), Knowledge (1997), Bel Esprit (2002), Reaan (2008) and Sepoy (2011)

Name
Prior 1996 the race was known as Blue Diamond Prelude (C&G) and was run at Sandown Racecourse and was not to be confused with the Blue Diamond Prelude C&G run at Caulfield Racecourse a couple of weeks later at a distance of 1,100 metres.

Grade
1982–1987 - Listed race
 1988–2005 - Group 3
 2006 onwards - Listed race

Distance
 1982–1983 – 1200 metres
 1984 onwards - 1000 metres

Venue
 1988–1996 - Sandown Racecourse
 1997–2005 -  Caulfield Racecourse
 2006 - Sandown Racecourse
 2007–2014 -  Caulfield Racecourse
 2015 - Sandown Racecourse
 2016 onwards - Caulfield Racecourse

Winners

 2023 - The Instructor 
 2022 - Daumier 
2021 - General Beau 
2020 - Hanseatic 
2019 - I Am Immortal  
2018 - Long Leaf
2017 - Property
2016 - Cohesion
2015 - Burnstone
2014 - Mohave
2013 - Dissident
2012 - The Travelling Man
2011 - Sepoy
2010 - Innocent Gamble
2009 - Reward For Effort
2008 - Reaan
2007 - Cecconi
2006 - Kapphero
2005 - Danger Looms
2004 - Sanziro
2003 - Murphy's Blu Boy
2002 - Bel Esprit
2001 - Sheraton
2000 - Toorak Thunder
1999 - Cullen
1998 - Special Edition
1997 - Knowledge
1996 - Jumpin' Jive
1995 - Tuscany Flyer
1994 - Renarchi
1993 - St. Rory
1992 - Vertingly
1991 - Noble Lancer
1990 - Canny Lad
1988 - Zeditave
1987 - †Midnight Fever / Change Of Habit

† The event held in divisions

See also
 List of Australian Group races
 Group races

References

Horse races in Australia
Caulfield Racecourse
Flat horse races for two-year-olds